John McCain, the nominee of the Republican party in the 2008 United States presidential election, has gained the endorsements of many high-profile figures.

Both McCain and his Democratic opponent, Barack Obama, have stated that a person or entity's endorsement of their candidacy does not necessarily imply an endorsement by the candidate of all of the views of the endorser.

U.S. presidents, vice presidents, and spouses
President George W. Bush
Vice President Dick Cheney
Former President George H. W. Bush
Former Vice President Dan Quayle
Former First Lady Nancy Reagan

U.S. senators

U.S. representatives

Governors

Retired military
Senator McCain was endorsed by over 100 retired generals and admirals from the U.S. Army, Navy, Air Force, and Marine Corps, among them:

Mayors
Tommy Joe Alexander of Irondale, Alabama
Carlos Alvarez of Miami-Dade County
Alan Autry of Fresno
Rich Crotty of Orange County, Florida
Richard J. Gerbounka of Linden, New Jersey (I-NJ) 
Rudy Giuliani, former mayor of New York City, former 2008 presidential candidate

State, local, and territorial officials

Other political figures

National figures
Francis J. Beckwith, Professor of Philosophy and Church-State Studies, Baylor University
Robert Gleason, Chairman of the Republican Party of Pennsylvania
John C. Hagee, founder and senior pastor of the evangelical mega-church Cornerstone Church in San Antonio, Texas
Fmr. Treasurer of the United States Rosario Marin (CA)

Newspapers

These newspapers have endorsed John McCain's general election run:

Academics
Anne O. Krueger, Economist and former World Bank Chief Economist.
Robert P. George, McCormick Professor of Jurisprudence at Princeton University.
Bernie Machen, president of the University of Florida.

Business people
Sheldon Adelson, Las Vegas Casino billionaire
Bradbury Anderson, Best Buy CEO
Hoyt R. Barnett, Publix Vice Chairman
August A. Busch III, former Anheuser-Busch Chairman
Pete Coors, Coors Brewing Company Chairman
Carly Fiorina, former CEO of Hewlett-Packard
Steve Forbes, magazine publisher, former GOP presidential candidate (1996, 2000)
Deal W. Hudson, Conservative publisher.
Tom Monaghan, founder of Domino's Pizza.
Frederick W. Smith, founder, chairman, president, and CEO of FedEx.
Donald Trump, chairman and CEO of the Trump Organization and future U.S. president
Robert Ulrich, Target Chairman and CEO
Michael D. White, Pepsi Vice Chairman
Meg Whitman, former CEO of eBay
Bob Wright, former NBC Universal Chairman and CEO

Entertainers

Foreign entertainers
Eduardo Verástegui, Mexican actor

Adult entertainment
Gauge, porn star
Teri Weigel, porn star

Athletes and sportspeople
Troy Aikman, former Dallas Cowboys quarterback
George Bodenheimer, ESPN President
Bryan Clay Olympic gold medalist in decathlon.
Bill Davidson, owner of the Detroit Pistons
Mike Ditka, ESPN NFL Analyst and Former Chicago Bears and New Orleans Saints Head Coach.
John Elway, Hall of Fame Denver Broncos quarterback
Al Leiter, Former MLB Pitcher.
Chuck Liddell, MMA fighter
Colette Nelson, IFBB professional bodybuilder
Brady Quinn, Cleveland Browns quarterback
Nolan Ryan, Hall of Fame MLB pitcher
Curt Schilling, Boston Red Sox pitcher
Jason Sehorn, retired New York Giants cornerback
Roger Staubach, Hall of Fame Dallas Cowboys quarterback
Joe Thomas, Cleveland Browns offensive tackle

Organizations
Al-Hesbah
National Rifle Association
Republicans for Environmental Protection
Log Cabin Republicans
Conservative Voice

Other individuals
Morris J. Amitay, AIPAC.
David Frum, Journalist.
Charles Krauthammer, Conservative political pundit
Michael Savage, radio host
Samuel Joseph Wurzelbacher "Joe the Plumber"

Foreign political figures
David Cameron, member of the British Conservative Party.
Wilfried Martens, president of the European People's Party

See also
Congressional endorsements for the 2008 United States presidential election
Newspaper endorsements in the United States presidential primaries, 2008
List of Barack Obama presidential campaign endorsements, 2008
List of Hillary Clinton 2008 presidential campaign endorsements
List of Ron Paul 2008 presidential endorsements
McCain Democrat

References

External links
Supporters list from the John McCain campaign website
List of endorsers, from Project Vote Smart.

John McCain 2008 presidential campaign
McCain, John
McCain presidential campaign endorsements, 2008
2008 United States presidential election endorsements